Ali Akbar Tabatabaei (4 September 1930 – 22 July 1980) was an Iranian exile and former press attache to the Iranian embassy in the United States during the reign of Shah Mohammad Reza Pahlavi.

Biography 
Ali Akbar Tabatabaei was born on 4 September 1930, in Hamedan, Imperial State of Persia, to a prominent Iranian family, he was the grandson of a mullah. He had a twin brother, Mohammad.

Tabatabaei attended Tehran University and had a degree in law. Tabatabaei came to the United States in 1952 with dreams about becoming an architect, and to study at Howard University's School of Architecture. While attended Howard University, he took a part-time job at the Iranian Embassy. There had been rumors he was connected to SAVAK, Iran's secret police during the Pahlavi-era.

It took Tabatabaei many years to complete his bachelor’s degree in architecture, around 1969 he returned to Tehran to work at the Iranian military of information to help foreigners learn more about Iranian life. It is unclear why he left Iran in 1972, it was either due to harassment by the SAVAK, a government embarrassment at work, or he was working for SAVAK and sent abroad. He briefly lived in Italy before moving to Ohio to work at an architecture firm.

In 1975, Ardeshir Zahedi, was named ambassador to Washington and Tabatabaei joined him to resume working at the Iranian embassy. After the Iranian Revolution in 1979, he continued his exile in the United States and actively criticized the Grand Ayatollah Ruhollah Khomeini. He became president of the Iran Freedom Foundation in Bethesda, Maryland, a counter-revolutionary group.

Death
On 22 July 1980, Tabatabaei was shot and killed on the front door of his Bethesda, Maryland, home by Dawud Salahuddin. Salahuddin is an American Muslim convert and also attended Howard University, he was associated with an Iranian militant group. Salahuddin disguised himself as a postman with a borrowed mail truck.

Tabatabaei's murder is allegedly considered the last successful Iranian assassination plot on American soil. Salahuddin stated he was paid $5,000 by Iranians to kill Tabatabaei. He is currently on the FBI fugitives list. He escaped to Iran via Paris and Geneva, reaching Tehran on 31 July 1980. In a 1996 interview with ABC's 20/20, Salahuddin again confessed to killing Tabatabaei. He further stated that he thought the killing was "an act of war". In 2009, it was discovered that Salahuddin had been using a new name, Hassan Abdulrahman, and that he had been running the website of Press TV.

References

1930 births
1980 deaths
Deaths by firearm in Maryland
Exiles of the Iranian Revolution in the United States
Howard University alumni
Iranian diplomats
Iranian emigrants to the United States
Iranian monarchists
Iranian people murdered abroad
People from Hamadan
People murdered in Maryland
People killed in Ministry of Intelligence (Iran) operations
University of Tehran alumni
Victims of religiously motivated violence in the United States
20th-century Iranian people
Iranian twins
Victims of Islamic terrorism